Proto-Celtic, or Common Celtic, is the ancestral proto-language of all known Celtic languages, and a descendant of Proto-Indo-European. It is not attested in writing but has been partly reconstructed through the comparative method. Proto-Celtic is generally thought to have been spoken between 1300 and 800 BC, after which it began to split into different languages. Proto-Celtic is often associated with the Urnfield culture and particularly with the Hallstatt culture. Celtic languages share common features with Italic languages that are not found in other branches of Indo-European, suggesting the possibility of an earlier Italo-Celtic linguistic unity. 

Proto-Celtic is currently being reconstructed through the comparative method by  relying on later Celtic languages. Though Continental Celtic presents much substantiation for Proto-Celtic phonology, and some for its morphology, recorded material is too scanty to allow a secure reconstruction of syntax, though some complete sentences are recorded in the Continental Gaulish and Celtiberian. So the main sources for reconstruction come from Insular Celtic languages with the oldest literature found in Old Irish and Middle Welsh, dating back to authors flourishing in the 6th century AD.

Dating
Proto-Celtic is usually dated to the Late Bronze Age, ca. 1200–900 BC. The fact that it is possible to reconstruct a Proto-Celtic word for 'iron' (traditionally reconstructed as *īsarnom) has long been taken as an indication that the divergence into individual Celtic languages did not start until the Iron Age (8th century BCE to 1st century BCE); otherwise, descendant languages would have developed their own, unrelated words for their metal. However, Schumacher and Schrijver suggest a date for Proto-Celtic as early as the 13th century BC, the time of the Canegrate culture, in northwest Italy, and the Urnfield culture in Central Europe, implying that the divergence may have already started in the Bronze Age.

Sound changes from Proto-Indo-European
The phonological changes from Proto-Indo-European (PIE) to Proto-Celtic (PC) may be summarized as follows. The changes are roughly in chronological order, with changes that operate on the outcome of earlier ones appearing later in the list.

Late PIE
These changes are shared by several other Indo-European branches.
 *e is colored by an adjacent laryngeal consonant:
 eh₂, h₂e > ah₂, h₂a
 eh₃, h₃e > oh₃, h₃o
 Palatovelars merge into the plain velars:
 ḱ > k
 ǵ > g
 ǵʰ > gʰ
 Epenthetic *a is inserted after a syllabic sonorant if a laryngeal and another sonorant follow (R̥HR > RaHR)
 Laryngeals are lost:
 before a following vowel (HV > V)
 following a vowel in syllables before the accent (VHC´ > VC´)
 following a vowel, resulting in compensatory lengthening, thus (VH > V̄)
 between plosives in non-initial syllables (CHC > CC)
 Two adjacent dentals become two adjacent sibilants (TT > ss)

Italo-Celtic
The following sound changes are shared with the Italic languages in particular, and are cited in support of the Italo-Celtic hypothesis.
 Dybo's rule: long close vowels are shortened (or a laryngeal is lost) before resonant + stressed vowel.
 īR´ / ? *iHR´ > iR´
 ūR´ / ? *uHR´ > uR´
 Possibly, post-consonantal laryngeals are lost when before pre-tonic close vowels:
 CHiC´ > CiC´
 CHuC´ > CuC´
 Development of initial stress, following the previous two changes.
 Possibly, vocalization of laryngeals to *ī between a *CR cluster and consonantal *j (CRHjV > CRījV)
 Syllabic laryngeals become *a (CHC > CaC)
 Syllabic resonants before a voiced unaspirated stop become *Ra (R̥D > RaD)
 *m is assimilated or lost before a glide:
 mj > nj
 mw > w
 *p assimilates to *kʷ when another *kʷ follows later in the word (p…kʷ > kʷ…kʷ)
 sVs > ss, sTVs > Ts

One change shows non-exact parallels in Italic: vocalization of syllabic resonants next to laryngeals depending on the environment. Similar developments appear in Italic, but for the syllabic nasals *m̥, *n̥, the result is Proto-Italic *əm, *ən (> Latin em ~ im, en ~ in).
 Word-initially, HR̥C > aRC
 Before voiceless stops, CR̥HT > CRaT
 CR̥HV > CaRHV
 CR̥HC > CRāC

Early PC
 Sequences of velar and *w merge into the labiovelars (it is uncertain if this preceded or followed the next change; that is, whether gw > b or gw > gʷ, but Schumacher 2004 argues on p. 372 that this change came first; moreover, it is also found in Proto-Italic, and thus arguably belongs to the previous section):
 kw > kʷ
 gw > gʷ
 gʰw > gʷʰ
 gʷ > b
 Aspirated stops lose their aspiration and merge with the voiced stops (except that this counterfeeds the previous change, so *gʷʰ > *gʷ doesn't result in a merger):
 bʰ > b
 dʰ > d
 gʰ > g
 gʷʰ > gʷ
 *e before a resonant and *a (but not *ā) becomes *a as well (eRa > aRa): *ǵʰelH-ro > *gelaro > *galaro / *gérH-no > *gerano > *garano (Joseph's rule).
 Epenthetic *i is inserted after syllabic liquids when followed by a plosive:
 l̥T > liT
 r̥T > riT
 Epenthetic *a is inserted before the remaining syllabic resonants:
 m̥ > am
 n̥ > an
 l̥ > al
 r̥ > ar
 All remaining nonsyllabic laryngeals are lost.
 ē > ī
 ō > ū in final syllables
 Long vowels are shortened before a syllable-final resonant (V:RC > VRC); this also shortens long diphthongs. (Osthoff's law)

Late PC
 Plosives become *x before a different plosive or *s (C₁C₂ > xC₂, Cs > xs)
 p > b before liquids (pL > bL)
 p > w before nasals (pN > wN)
 p > ɸ (except possibly after *s)
 ō > ā
 ey > ē
 ew > ow
 uwa > owa

Examples

{|class="wikitable"
|-
!colspan=2 rowspan=2|PIE
!rowspan=2|PC
!colspan=7|Example
|-
!PIE
!colspan=2|PC
!colspan=2|Old Irish
!colspan=2|Welsh
|-
|colspan=2|*
| *
| *
| *acc. *abonen
| river
|colspan=2|aub
|colspan=2|afon
|-
|colspan=2|*
| *
| *
| *
| brother
|colspan=2|bráthir
|colspan=2|brawd
|-
|colspan=2|*
| *
| *
| *
| old
|colspan=2|sen
|colspan=2|hen
|-
|*
| betweenconsonants
| *
| *
| *
| father
|colspan=2|athir
| edrydd
| cf. home
|-
|colspan=2|*
| *
| *
| *
| true
|colspan=2|fír
|colspan=2|gwir
|-
|colspan=2|*
| *
| *
| *
| wheel
|colspan=2|roth
|colspan=2|rhod
|-
|rowspan=2| *
| in final syllable
| *
| *
| *
| nephew
|colspan=2|niæ
|colspan=2|nai
|-
| elsewhere
| *
| *
| *
| gift
|colspan=2|dán
|colspan=2|dawn
|-
|colspan=2|*
| *
| *
| *
| world
|colspan=2|bith
|colspan=2|byd
|-
|colspan=2|*
| *
| *
| *
| number
|colspan=2|rím
|colspan=2|rhif
|-
|colspan=2|*
| *
| **
| **
| blindage
| cáech—
| one-eyed—
| coeghoedl
| empty, one-eyedage
|-
|colspan=2|*
| *
| *
| *
| god
|colspan=2|día
|colspan=2|duw 
|-
|colspan=2|*
| *
| *
| *
| one
|colspan=2|óen oín;áen aín
|colspan=2|un
|-
| rowspan=2| *
| before 
| 
| *
| * >*
| young
|colspan=2|óac
|colspan=2|ieuanc
|-
| elsewhere
| *
| *
| *
| stream
|colspan=2|sruth
|colspan=2|ffrwd
|-
|colspan=2|*
| *
| *
| *
| mystery
|colspan=2|rún
|colspan=2|rhin 
|-
|colspan=2|*
| *
| *
| *
| silent
| táue
| silence(*)
|colspan=2|taw
|-
|colspan=2|*;*
| *
| **
| **
| peoplecow
|colspan=2|túathbó
|colspan=2|tudM.W. bu, biw
|-
| rowspan=2 | *
| before stops
| *
| *
| *
| wide
|colspan=2|lethan
|colspan=2|llydan
|-
| before otherconsonants
| *
| *
| *
| rooster
|colspan=2|cailech(Ogham gen. )
|colspan=2|ceiliog|-
| rowspan=2 | *
| before stops
| *
| *
| *
| act of bearing; mind
|colspan=2|breth, brith|colspan=2|bryd|-
| before otherconsonants
| *
| *
| *
| dead
|colspan=2|marb|colspan=2|marw|-
|colspan=2|*
| *
| *
| *
| subdue
| M.Ir.damnaid| he ties,fastens,binds
|colspan=2|—
|-
|colspan=2|*
| *
| *
| *
| tooth
|colspan=2|dét 
|colspan=2|dant|-
| rowspan=2| *
| before obstruents
| *
| *
| *
| lordship
|colspan=2|flaith| gwlad| country
|-
| before sonorants
| *
| *
| *
| hand
|colspan=2|lám|colspan=2|llaw|-
| rowspan=2| *
| before obstruents
| *
| *
| *
| betrayal
|colspan=2|mrath|colspan=2|brad|-
| before sonorants
| *
| *
| *
| grain
|colspan=2|grán|colspan=2|grawn|-
| *
| rowspan=2|(presumably withsame distributionas above)
| *
| *
| *
| to tame
| daimidfodam-| daimid-
| goddef| endure, suffer
|-
| *
| *
| * ?
| *
| known
| colspan=2|gnáth| gnawd| customary
|}

Phonological reconstruction

Consonants
The following consonants have been reconstructed for Proto-Celtic (PC):
{| class="wikitable"
|-
! rowspan="2" |Manner
! rowspan="2" |Voicing
! rowspan="2" | Bilabial 
! rowspan="2" | Alveolar 
! rowspan="2" | Palatal 
! colspan="2" | Velar 
|-
! |plain
! |labialized
|- style="text-align:center;"
! rowspan="2" | Plosive
!voiceless
|
| 
|
| 
| 
|- style="text-align:center;"
!voiced
| 
| 
|
| 
| 
|- style="text-align:center;"
! colspan="2" | Fricative
| 
| 
|
| 
|
|- style="text-align:center;"
! colspan="2" | Nasal
| |
| |
|
|
|
|- style="text-align:center;"
! colspan="2" | Approximant
|
| 
| 
|
| 
|- style="text-align:center;"
! colspan="2" | Trill
|
| 
| 
|
|
|}

Allophones of plosives
PC stops allophonically manifest similarly to those in English. Voiceless stop phonemes /t k/ were aspirated word-initially except when preceded by /s/, hence aspirate allophones [tʰ kʰ]. And unaspirated voiced stops /b d ɡ/ were devoiced to [p t k] word-initially.

This allophony may be reconstructed to PC from the following evidence:
 Modern Celtic languages like Welsh, Breton, and all modern Goidelic languages have such plosive aspiration and voice allophony already attested.
 Several old Celtic languages (such as Old Irish, Old Welsh, and Lepontic) used letters for voiceless stop phonemes to write both voiceless stop phonemes and their voiced counterparts, especially non-word-initially.
 The Celtiberian Luzaga's Bronze has the curious spelling of an accusative determiner sdam, where the d is clearly meant to spell [t]. This implies that Celtiberian /d/ had a voiceless allophone .

Evolution of plosives
Proto-Indo-European (PIE) voiced aspirate stops *bʰ, *dʰ, *gʰ/ǵʰ, merge with *b, *d, *g/ǵ in PC. The voiced aspirate labiovelar *gʷʰ did not merge with *gʷ, though: plain *gʷ became PC *b, while aspirated *gʷʰ became *gʷ. Thus, PIE *gʷen- 'woman' became Old Irish and Old Welsh ben, but PIE *gʷʰn̥- 'to kill, wound' became Old Irish gonaid and Welsh gwanu.

PIE *p is lost in PC, apparently going through the stages *ɸ (possibly a stage *[pʰ]) and *h (perhaps seen in the name Hercynia if this is of Celtic origin) before being completely lost word-initially and between vowels. Next to consonants, PC *ɸ underwent different changes: the clusters *ɸs and *ɸt became *xs and *xt respectively already in PC. PIE *sp- became Old Irish s (lenited f-, exactly as for PIE *sw-) and Brythonic f; while  argues there was an intermediate stage *sɸ- (in which *ɸ remained an independent phoneme until after Proto-Insular Celtic had diverged into Goidelic and Brythonic),  finds it more economical to believe that *sp- remained unchanged in PC, that is, the change *p to *ɸ did not happen when *s preceded. (Similarly, Grimm's law did not apply to *p, t, k after *s in Germanic, and the same exception occurred again in the High German consonant shift.)

{|class="wikitable"
! Proto-Celtic
! Old Irish
! Welsh
|-
| * > * 'shine'
| las-aid| llach-ar|-
| * > * 'seven'
| secht| saith|-
| * or * 'heel'
| seir| ffêr|}

In Gaulish and the Brittonic languages, the Proto-Indo-European * phoneme becomes a new * sound. Thus, Gaulish petuar[ios], Welsh pedwar "four", but Old Irish cethair and Latin quattuor. Insofar as this new  fills the gap in the phoneme inventory which was left by the disappearance of the equivalent stop in PIE, we may think of this as a chain shift.

The terms P-Celtic and Q-Celtic are useful for grouping Celtic languages based on the way they handle this one phoneme. But a simple division into P- / Q-Celtic may be untenable, as it does not do justice to the evidence of the ancient Continental Celtic languages. The many unusual shared innovations among the Insular Celtic languages are often also presented as evidence against a P- vs Q-Celtic division, but they may instead reflect a common substratum influence from the pre-Celtic languages of Britain and Ireland,, or simply continuing contact between the insular languages; in either case they would be irrelevant to the genetic classification of Celtic languages.

Q-Celtic languages may also have  in loan words, though in early borrowings from Welsh into Primitive Irish,  was used by sound substitution due to a lack of a  phoneme at the time:
Latin Patricius "Saint Patrick"' > Welsh > Primitive Irish  > Old Irish Cothrige, later Pádraig;
Latin presbyter "priest" > early form of word seen in Old Welsh premter primter > Primitive Irish  > Old Irish cruimther.
Gaelic póg "kiss" was a later borrowing (from the second word of the Latin phrase osculum pacis "kiss of peace") at a stage where p was borrowed directly as p, without substituting c.

Vowels
The PC vowel system is highly comparable to that reconstructed for PIE by Antoine Meillet. The following monophthongs are reconstructed:
{| class="wikitable"
! rowspan="2" | Type
! colspan="2" | Front
! colspan="2" | Central
! colspan="2" | Back
|- style="text-align:center;"
!  long 
!  short 
!  long 
!  short 
!  long 
!  short 
|- style="text-align:center;"
! Close
| 
| 
| colspan="2" |  
| 
| 
|- style="text-align:center;"
! Mid
| 
| 
| colspan="2"| 
| 
| 
|- style="text-align:center;"
! Open
| colspan="2" |  
| 
| 
| colspan="2" |  
|}

The following diphthongs have also been reconstructed:
{| class="wikitable"
|-
|+
! Type
! With -i! With -u|-align=center
!With a- 
| || 
|-align=center
!With o- 
| || 
|-align=center
|}

Morphology

Nouns

The morphological (structure) of nouns and adjectives demonstrates no arresting alterations from the parent language. Proto-Celtic is believed to have had nouns in three genders, three numbers and five to eight cases. The genders were masculine, feminine and neuter; the numbers were singular, plural and dual. The number of cases is a subject of contention: while Old Irish may have only five, the evidence from Continental Celtic is considered rather unambiguous despite appeals to archaic retentions or morphological leveling. These cases were nominative, vocative, accusative, dative, genitive, ablative, locative and instrumental.

Nouns fall into nine or so declensions, depending on stem. There are *o-stems, *ā-stems, *i-stems, *u-stems, dental stems, velar stems, nasal stems, *r-stems and *s-stems.

*o-stem nounsmakkʷos 'son' (masculine) (Old Irish mac ~ Welsh, Cornish and Breton mab)dūnom 'stronghold' (neuter)

*ā-stem nouns
E.g. *ɸlāmā 'hand' (feminine) (Old Irish lám; Welsh llaw, Cornish leuv, Old Breton lom)

*i-stems
E.g. *sūlis 'sight, view, eye' (feminine) (Brittonic sulis ~ Old Irish súil)

E.g. *mori 'body of water, sea' (neuter) (Gaulish Mori- ~ Old Irish muir ~ Welsh môr)

*u-stem nouns
E.g. *bitus 'world, existence' (masculine) (Gaulish Bitu- ~ Old Irish bith ~ Welsh byd ~ Breton bed)

E.g.  "rotisserie spit" (neuter)

Velar and dental stems
Before the *-s of the nominative singular, a velar consonant was fricated to *-x :  "king" > . Likewise, final *-d devoiced to *-t-:  "druid" > .

E.g.  "king" (masculine)

E.g.  "druid" (masculine)

E.g.  "friend" (masculine)

Nasal stems
Generally, nasal stems end in *-on-; this becomes *-ū in the nominative singular: *abon- "river" > *abū.E.g.  "river" (feminine)

E.g.  "name" (neuter)

*s-stem nouns
Generally,-stems contain an *-es-, which becomes *-os in the nominative singular:  'house' > .

E.g. "house" (neuter)

*r-stem nounsr-stems are rare and principally confined to names of relatives. Typically they end in *-ter-, which becomes *-tīr in the nominative and *-tr- in all other cases aside from the accusative: *ɸater- 'father' > *ɸatīr, *ɸatros.

E.g. *ɸatīr 'father' (masculine)

E.g. *mātīr 'mother' (feminine)

Pronouns
The following personal pronouns in Celtic can be reconstructed as follows:

The following third-person pronouns in Proto-Celtic may also be reconstructed.

Verbs
From comparison between early Old Irish and Gaulish forms it seems that Continental and Insular Celtic verbs developed differently and so the study of Irish and Welsh may have unduly weighted past opinion of Proto-Celtic verb morphology. It can be inferred from Gaulish and Celtiberian as well as Insular Celtic that the Proto-Celtic verb had at least three moods:
 indicative — seen in e.g. 1st  Gaulish delgu "I hold", Old Irish tongu "I swear"
 imperative — seen in e.g. 3rd  Celtiberian usabituz, Gaulish appisetu subjunctive — seen in e.g. 3rd  Gaulish buetid "may he be", Celtiberian asekatiand four tenses:
 present — seen in e.g. Gaulish uediíu-mi "I pray", Celtiberian zizonti "they sow"
 preterite — seen in e.g. 3rd  Gaulish sioxti, Lepontic KariTe imperfect — perhaps in Celtiberian kombalkez, atibion future — seen in e.g. 3rd  Gaulish bissiet, Old Irish bieid "he shall be"
A probable optative mood also features in Gaulish (tixsintor) and an infinitive (with a characteristic ending -unei) in Celtiberian.Pierre-Yves Lambert, La langue gauloise: Description linguistique, commentaire d'inscriptions choisies (Paris: Errance, revised ed. 2003).

Verbs were formed by adding suffixes to a verbal stem. The stem might be thematic or athematic, an open or a closed syllable.

Primary endings
The primary endings in Proto-Celtic were as follows. They were used to form the present, future, and subjunctive conjugations.

Nasal-infix presents
In Proto-Celtic, the Indo-European nasal infix presents split into two categories: ones originally derived from laryngeal-final roots (i.e. seṭ roots in Sanskrit), and ones that were not (i.e. from aniṭ roots). In seṭ verbs, the nasal appears at the end of the present stem, while in aniṭ-derived verbs the nasal was followed by a root-final stop (generally -g- in Old Irish). Aniṭ nasal infix verbs conjugated exactly like basic thematic verbs in the present tense.

On the other hand, the seṭ presents originally had a long vowel after the nasal in the singular and -a- after the nasal in the plural, but the attested Celtic languages levelled this alternation away. Gaulish shows traces of the singular long-vowel vocalism while Old Irish generalized the plural -a- to the singular.

Preterite formations
There were two or three major preterite formations in Proto-Celtic, plus another moribund type.
 The s-preterite
 The reduplicated suffixless preterite (originating from the PIE reduplicated stative)
 The t-preterite
 The root aorist

The s-, t-, and root aorist preterites take Indo-European secondary endings, while the reduplicated suffix preterite took stative endings. These endings are:

t-preterite
The Old Irish t-preterite was traditionally assumed to be a divergent evolution from the s-preterite, but that derivation was challenged by Jay Jasanoff, who alleges that they were instead imperfects of Narten presents. Either derivation requires Narten ablaut anyway, leading to a stem vowel i in the singular and e in the plural. The stem vowel in the t-preterite was leveled to  *e if the next consonant was either velar or *m, and *i in front of *r or *l.

Future formations
One major formation of the future in Celtic, the s-future. It is a descendant of the Proto-Indo-European (h₁)se-desirative, with i-reduplication in many verbs. The Old Irish a- and s-future come from here.

Another future formation, attested only in Gaulish, is the -sye-desiderative.

Subjunctive formations
Most verbs took one subjunctive suffix in Proto-Celtic, -(a)s-, followed by the thematic primary endings. It was a descendant of the subjunctive of an Indo-European sigmatic thematic formation *-seti. The -ase- variant originated in roots that ended in a laryngeal in Proto-Indo-European; when the *-se- suffix was attached right after a laryngeal, the laryngeal regularly vocalized into *-a-. It would then analogically spread to other Celtic strong verb roots ending in sonorants in addition to the weak verbs, even if the root did not originally end in a laryngeal.

There were also three verbs that did not use -(a)se-, instead straight-out taking thematised primary endings. Two of these verbs are  "to be, exist" (subjunctive ) and  "to hear" (subjunctive ).

Primary subjunctive formations in Proto-Celtic generally use the e-grade of the verb root, even if the present stem uses the zero-grade.

Imperative formation
Imperative endings in Proto-Celtic were as follows:

Second-person singular imperative
The second-person singular imperative was generally endingless in the active; no ending was generally added to athematic verbs. On thematic -e/o- verbs, the imperative ended in thematic vowel *-e. However, there is also another second-person singular active imperative ending, -si, which was attached to the verb root athematically even with thematic strong verbs.

The thematic deponent second-person singular imperative ending was *-eso. The -the in Old Irish is secondary.

Example conjugations
Scholarly reconstructions Alan Ward, A Checklist of Proto-Celtic Lexical Items (1982, revised 1996), 7–14. may be summarised in tabular format.

Copula
The copula *esti'' was irregular. It had both athematic and thematic conjugations in the present tense. Schrijver supposes that its athematic present was used clause-initially and the thematic conjugation was used when that was not the case.

See also
Pre-Celtic
Italo-Celtic
Beaker culture
Urnfield
Hallstatt culture
La Tène culture
Goidelic substrate hypothesis
Ligures
Azilian

References
Notes

Bibliography

External links

The Leiden University has compiled etymological dictionaries of various IE languages, a project supervised by Alexander Lubotsky and which includes a Proto-Celtic dictionary by Ranko Matasović. Those dictionaries published by Brill in the Leiden series have been removed from the University databases for copyright reasons. Alternatively, a reference for Proto-Celtic vocabulary is provided by the University of Wales at the following sites:
  Proto-Celtic to English Wordlist (PDF)
  English to Proto-Celtic Wordlist (PDF)

Celtic languages
Celtic